The 2000 Minnesota House of Representatives election was held in the U.S. state of Minnesota on November 7, 2000, to elect members to the House of Representatives of the 82nd Minnesota Legislature. A primary election was held on September 12, 2000.

The Republican Party of Minnesota won a majority of seats, remaining the majority party, followed by the Minnesota Democratic–Farmer–Labor Party (DFL). The new Legislature convened on January 3, 2001.

Results

See also
 Minnesota Senate election, 2000
 Minnesota gubernatorial election, 1998

References

2000 Minnesota elections
Minnesota House of Representatives elections
Minnesota